Karabas or Carabas may refer to:

 Karabas Barabas, a villain in Buratino, Russian fairy tale
 Karabas (or Carabas; Greek: Καραβᾶς), is the name of an idiot mentioned by Philo in his Flaccus, part of an incident in Alexandria in AD 38, mocking the Jewish king Herod Agrippa I.
 Karabaş (or Karabash), alternative name for Anatolian Shepherd Dog, a dog breed
 Marquis of Carabas, a fictional character in the fairy tale "Puss in Boots"